Pakistan International Airlines Flight 404 was a Fokker F27 Friendship that disappeared shortly after takeoff on 25 August 1989. The aircraft presumably crashed somewhere in the Himalaya Mountains, Pakistan. All 54 people on board were lost and presumed dead.

Disappearance 
At 07:36, a domestic scheduled passenger flight of Pakistan International Airlines took off from the northern city of Gilgit, Pakistan on its way to the national capital Islamabad. One of the pilots of the aircraft made a routine radio call at 07:40; this was the last communication with the aircraft. The aircraft is thought to have crashed in the Himalayas, but the wreckage has never been found.

Aircraft
The aircraft was a Fokker F27-200 Friendship turboprop airliner, c/n 10207, built in 1962 and registered as AP-BBF. It had accumulated approximately 44,524 hours of flying time; and 41,524 cycles (the number of times the aircraft had been pressurized) at the time of the accident.

Search operation 
After the disappearance, several aerial search missions were launched by the Pakistani military during the first three or four days. Later land search parties were organized, comprising civilian and armed forces personnel, to search the area around the  mountain Nanga Parbat.

See also 
List of missing aircraft
List of aviation accidents

References

Airliner accidents and incidents involving controlled flight into terrain
Pakistan International Airlines accidents and incidents
Airliner accidents and incidents with an unknown cause
Aviation accidents and incidents in 1989
Aviation accidents and incidents in Pakistan
Accidents and incidents involving the Fokker F27
Missing aircraft
1989 in Pakistan
August 1989 events in Asia